Inverness Highlands North is an unincorporated area and census-designated place (CDP) in Citrus County, Florida, United States. The population was 2,401 at the 2010 census, up from 1,470 in 2000.

Geography
Inverness Highlands North is located in eastern Citrus County at  (28.864238, -82.377723), up against the northwest corner of the city of Inverness, the county seat. The CDP is bordered to the north by Hernando and to the northwest by Citrus Hills. State Road 44 forms the southern edge of the CDP, leading east into Inverness and west  to Crystal River.

Demographics

As of the census of 2000, there were 1,470 people, 616 households, and 434 families residing in the CDP. The racial makeup of the CDP was 91.77% White, 6.05% African American, 0.07% Native American, 0.27% Asian, 0.14% from other races, and 1.70% from two or more races. Hispanic or Latino of any race were 2.59% of the population.

There were 616 households, out of which 26.8% had children under the age of 18 living with them, 57.1% were married couples living together, 9.7% had a female householder with no husband present, and 29.5% were non-families. 25.2% of all households were made up of individuals, and 12.5% had someone living alone who was 65 years of age or older.  The average household size was 2.39 and the average family size was 2.80.

In the CDP, the population was spread out, with 22.4% under the age of 18, 6.7% from 18 to 24, 24.3% from 25 to 44, 23.0% from 45 to 64, and 23.6% who were 65 years of age or older.  The median age was 42 years. For every 100 females, there were 89.2 males.  For every 100 females age 18 and over, there were 83.0 males.

The median income for a household in the CDP was $27,128, and the median income for a family was $28,821. Males had a median income of $30,263 versus $21,161 for females. The per capita income for the CDP was $12,818.  About 13.1% of families and 14.0% of the population were below the poverty line, including 13.0% of those under age 18 and 12.4% of those age 65 or over.

Public transportation
Citrus County Transit's Orange route serves Inverness.

Education
The CDP is served by Citrus County Schools. Elementary schools serving sections of the CDP include Hernando and Pleasant Grove. All residents are zoned to Inverness Middle School, and Citrus High School.

References

Census-designated places in Citrus County, Florida
Census-designated places in Florida